Mérignac Handball is the name of a French handball club from Mérignac, France. This team currently competes in the French Women's Handball First League from 2019 and they play their home matches in Salle Pierre de Coubertin.

Team

Current squad
Squad for the 2021-22 season.

Goalkeepers
 28  Hélène Falcon
 29  Léna Le Borgne
 16  Keran Bekrou-Brega
LW
 6  Léa Lignières 
 8  Mélanie Jobard
RW
 25  Julie Abadie
 17  Sarah Navarro-Cano 
Line players
 10  Emma Puleri
 37  Anna Lacuey
 15  Eva Desirliste
 77  Medea Chokheli

Back players
LB 
 7  Phellys Kibuye
 14  Laurie Puleri
 27  Ilona Kieffer
CB
 36  Julie Dazet
 18  Nele Antonissen
 19  Laurène Catani
RB
 92  Audrey Deroin
 9  Luciana Mendoza
 13  Soukeina Sagna

Transfers
Transfers for the 2022-23 season 

 Joining
 Noémie Lachaud (LP) (from  OGC Nice Côte d'Azur Handball) Anouck Clément (LP) (from  Jeanne d'Arc Dijon Handball)
 Sofia Deen (LB) (from  Bourg-de-Péage Drôme Handball) Leaving
 Emma Puleri (LP) (to  Saint-Amand Handball)

References

External links
 

French handball clubs
Sport in Gironde
Handball clubs established in 1960
1960 establishments in France